The Knight Has Arrived! (Italian: È arrivato il cavaliere!)  is a 1950 Italian comedy film directed by Mario Monicelli and Steno and starring Tino Scotti, Silvana Pampanini and Nyta Dover.

The film's sets were designed by the art director Flavio Mogherini. It earned around 254 million lira at the Italian box office. It was shown as part of a retrospective on Italian comedy at the 67th Venice International Film Festival in 2010.

Synopsis
The eccentric leader of a group of small-time Hawkers known as "The Knight" tries to prevent the area they use from being redeveloped as part of a new business and Metro station complex. Employing a number of surreal schemes, he is eventually successful.

Cast
Tino Scotti as Il Cavaliere
Silvana Pampanini as Carla Colombo
Enrico Viarisio as Il Ministro
Enzo Biliotti as Il Commissario
Nyta Dover as Musette
Rocco D'Assunta as Capo dei Banditi
Galeazzo Benti as Marchese Bevilacqua
Marcella Rovena as Signora Varelli
Alda Mangini as Moglie del Ministro
Federico Collino as Commendatore Varelli
Giovanna Galletti as Signora Colombo
Carlo Mazzarella as L'Assessore
Arturo Bragaglia as Buchs
Ettore Jannetti as Signor Colombo

References

Bibliography
 Chiti, Roberto & Poppi, Roberto. Dizionario del cinema italiano: Dal 1945 al 1959. Gremese Editore, 1991.

External links 
 
 

1950 films
Films scored by Nino Rota
1950s Italian-language films
1950 comedy films
Films directed by Mario Monicelli
Films directed by Stefano Vanzina
Italian comedy films
Italian black-and-white films
Minerva Film films
1950s Italian films